"The Angel of 8th Ave." (stylised the angel of 8th ave.) is a song by Australian alternative rock band Gang of Youths, released on 15 June 2021 as the lead single from their second EP, Total Serene (2021). The track also features on the band's third studio album, Angel in Realtime (2022). It was the band's first original release in four years, and was regarded by many outlets as their "comeback". Frontman David Le'aupepe said the song was inspired by "falling in love and finding a new life in a new city together."

It peaked at number 48 on the ARIA Singles Chart. At the 2021 ARIA Music Awards, the song earned the group a nomination for Best Group. At the APRA Music Awards of 2022, the song was nominated for Most Performed Rock Work.

Music video
The music video was released on 16 June 2021. The video was directed by Joel Barney and filmed in the Angel area of London.

Critical reception
Al Newstead from Triple J called it a "big, cathartic rock number." Emmy Mack from Music Feeds said, "it's made of the same poetic, life-affirming, retro-infused indie rock that fans have grown to know and love from Gang of Youths".

Chart performance
On 23 June 2021, Australian Recording Industry Association (ARIA) released their mid-week chart report, which stated that the song was likely to debut within the top 50 on the ARIA Singles Chart later that week. On 25 June, "The Angel of 8th Ave." debuted and peaked at number 48 on the ARIA Singles Chart, surpassing "Let Me Down Easy" (which peaked at number 49 in February 2018) as their highest peak in the region.

Credits and personnel
Gang of Youths
 David Le'aupepe – writing, vocals, rhythm guitar
 Jung Kim – keyboards, piano, guitar
 Max Dunn – bass guitar
 Donnie Borzestowski – drums
 Tom Hobden – violin, guitar, keyboards

Charts

References

2021 singles
2021 songs
Gang of Youths songs
Songs written by David Le'aupepe
Warner Records singles